Newcastle TDC Northern Stars were a semi-professional ice hockey team, previously known as the Newcastle ENL Vipers. The Vipers were founded in 2005 and played out of Metro Radio Arena which had a capacity of 5,500. They eventually changed names from the Vipers to the Northern Stars. In 2010 the team moved to Whitley Bay Arena which had a capacity of 3,200. The team was sponsored by TDC Waste Management and competed in the English National Hockey League North 1 Division and the NIHL.

Prior to the 2011/12 season the Northern Stars merged with Billingham Bombers to form the Billingham Stars which also compete in the ENL.

2010 Team Roster

Head Coach: Ivor Bennett & Stephen Foster

Goaltenders

Skaters

2009 Team Roster

Head Coach: Pete Winn

Regular Season: 24-20-2-2

Goaltenders

Defencemen

Forwards

References

Ice hockey teams in England
Sport in Newcastle upon Tyne